The Frank Eugene Nichols House is located in Onalaska, Wisconsin. It was added to the State Register of Historic Places in 1992 and to the National Register of Historic Places the following year.

References

Houses on the National Register of Historic Places in Wisconsin
National Register of Historic Places in La Crosse County, Wisconsin
Buildings and structures in La Crosse County, Wisconsin
Queen Anne architecture in Wisconsin